John Fielding Crigler (11 September 1919 - 13 May 2018) was an American pediatrician. Along with Victor Assad Najjar, Crigler is known for Crigler–Najjar syndrome. He studied medicine at the Duke University School of Medicine, graduating in 1943. He trained in pediatrics at Boston Children's Hospital.

References

1919 births
2018 deaths
American pediatricians
Duke University School of Medicine alumni